At the 1948 Winter Olympics in St. Moritz, Switzerland in 1948, the last military patrol competition was held as a demonstration sport. This was in part to the aftermath of World War II, which decimated Europe. This sport would be superseded by the biathlon competition which debuted at the 1960 Winter Olympics. The cross-country ski run was not prepared, and was made by the leading Swiss team. The Czechoslovak participant Karel Dvořák described the weather of the day as extremely mild with temperatures of about 0 °C at the starting point at the upper cableway station (2,486 m) on top of the Corviglia in the morning. The participants wore military equipment, 10 kg of baggage on the back and a military rifle. Only the officers, the patrol leaders, had pistols and did not compete in shooting. At the shooting range they had to shoot on three rubber balloons at a distance of 150 m. Every hit gave a bonus of 1 minute for the team.

Event held on February 8, 1948

Notes and references

External links
 Official report of the 1948 Olympic Winter Games

1948 Winter Olympics events
1948
1948 in biathlon
1948 in cross-country skiing
1948 in military history
Men's events at the 1948 Winter Olympics